This is a list of current foreign ministers of the 193 United Nations member states as well as the Holy See (Vatican City) and the State of Palestine.

Foreign ministers of sovereign countries with limited recognition, some alternative governments, some dependent territories and some autonomous administrative divisions are included in separate tables.

Generally recognised sovereign states

Other states
The following states control their territory and are recognized by at least one  member state.

The following states/governments control their territory, but are not recognized by any  member states.

Other governments
These alternative governments are recognized as a sovereign state by at least one  member.

The alternative governments are not recognized by any  member states.

Sui generis entities

Dependent territories

Autonomous administrative divisions

See also 
:Category:Lists of foreign ministers by year 	
Lists of office-holders 	
List of foreign ministers in 
List of current presidents of legislatures 	
List of current heads of state and government 	
List of current vice presidents and designated acting presidents 
List of current permanent representatives to the United Nations 	
List of female foreign ministers

Notes

 Foreign ministers, current
!
Foreign ministers